Maxim Valeryevich Chudinov (born 25 March 1990) is a Russian professional ice hockey player who is currently on under contract with HC Spartak Moscow of the Kontinental Hockey League (KHL). Chudinov was drafted by the Boston Bruins in the 7th round (195th overall) of the 2010 NHL Entry Draft.

Playing career
During the 2017–18 season, his sixth with SKA Saint Petersburg, Chudinov was traded to Avangard Omsk in exchange for prospect Dmitry Zavgorodniy on October 15, 2017.

After sitting out the 2021–22 season, Chudinov attempted a return to the KHL in agreeing to a try-out deal to attend the pre-season training camp with Ak Bars Kazan on 5 July 2022.

Chudinov made the opening night roster for Ak Bars for the 2022–23 season and made 7 appearances before he was signed to a one-year contract with fellow KHL team, HC Spartak Moscow, on 22 November 2022.

Career statistics

Regular season and playoffs

International

Awards and honors

References

External links

1990 births
Ak Bars Kazan players
Avangard Omsk players
Boston Bruins draft picks
Living people
Russian ice hockey defencemen
People from Cherepovets
Severstal Cherepovets players
SKA Saint Petersburg players
HC Spartak Moscow players
Sportspeople from Vologda Oblast